Snillfjord Church is a parish church of the Church of Norway in Orkland Municipality in Trøndelag county, Norway. It is located in the village of Krokstadøra. It is the church for the Snillfjord parish which is part of the Orkdal prosti (deanery) in the Diocese of Nidaros. The white, wooden church was built in a long church style in 1899 by the architect Ole Falck Ebbell. The church seats about 250 people.

History
The church in Snillfjord was built in 1898-1899. The architect was Ole Falck Ebbell and the lead builders were Ole and Johan Væge. The new building was consecrated on 27 September 1899 by the Bishop Johannes Skaar. The baptismal sacristy was built in 1978, and the church underwent a restoration in 1989.

See also
List of churches in Nidaros

References

Orkland
Churches in Trøndelag
Long churches in Norway
Wooden churches in Norway
19th-century Church of Norway church buildings
Churches completed in 1899
1899 establishments in Norway